William Maurice Hayes (30 April 1896 – 7 November 1969) was an Australian rules footballer who played with Essendon in the Victorian Football League (VFL).

Notes

External links 
		

1896 births
1969 deaths
Australian rules footballers from Victoria (Australia)
Essendon Football Club players